is a Japanese yuri manga series written and illustrated by Takashi Ikeda. It was serialized in Media Factory's seinen manga magazine Monthly Comic Alive between March 2007 and November 2011, and was compiled into nine tankōbon volumes. The series has been licensed in North America by One Peace Books. It was adapted as a 13-episode anime television series produced by AIC that aired between October and December 2009 on TV Tokyo. The series, which is set in a co-ed high school, is about Sumika Murasame, a 15-year-old girl who is secretly in love with her female best friend, Ushio Kazama. Ushio likes girls too, but is only into "cute" and "small" girls, while Sumika is tall, good at sports, and outgoing rather than shy.

Plot
Sumika Murasame is a high school girl who is in love with her female best friend Ushio Kazama, but is unable to confess how she feels as Ushio only likes girls she considers to be "cute" and "small", while Sumika is tall and athletic. Sumika discovers one of her classmates, a boy named Masaki Akemiya who likes her, started cross-dressing to catch her attention, but inadvertently was hired as a model. Sumika and Ushio get to know two girls in their class who are a couple, Tomoe Hachikusa and Miyako Taema; Tomoe wants to start a "girl's club" where only lesbians can join but is wrought with opposition. Sumika agrees to go on one date with Masaki, who comes cross-dressed as his female persona Akemi Yamasaki. Sumika becomes involved with her classmate Azusa Aoi, a quiet girl and aspiring writer who plans to attend a dōjinshi convention fueled by her love of yuri author Orino Masaka, which is the pen name of Ushio's older brother Norio. Sumika gets roped into helping Azusa and attending the summer convention as well, despite wanting to spend time with Ushio.

After the sports day competition and cultural festival, a short German high school girl named Charlotte Münchhausen (nicknamed Lotte), comes to stay at Sumika's home and dojo to train in karate. Sumika, who had quit karate because it is not "cute", starts training again to help in Charlotte's training, much to the joy of Sumika's father. Ushio is unhappy about Charlotte's training and merely wants her to be a gentle, cute girl. Charlotte gets sick after running in the rain during training, and after Ushio confronts her about it, Sumika lashes out, distraught how she cannot become any cuter or smaller. Following Tomoe's suggestion, a female karate club is formed with Sumika as the president and Charlotte as the vice-president. After Ushio starts realizing she has romantic feelings for Sumika, she starts to worry that Sumika may stop being friends with her. Masaki stops being a fashion model after being traumatically exposed as a cross-dresser.

After Sumika and her friends enter their second year of high school, two first-year girls named Mayu Semimaru and Koino Matsubara join the female karate club. Sumika is troubled over her relationship with Ushio, which has an adverse effect on her karate performance, much to the disappointment of Mayu. Sumika starts to get more involved with karate training to take her mind off of Ushio and in doing so, inadvertently distances herself from her. Ushio breaks down in depression because of this distancing, which results in Ushio breaking her arm, but is able to make up with Sumika. Tomoe accidentally implies to Ushio that Sumika has romantic feelings for her, much to Ushio's surprise, and Ushio finally accepts that she has fallen in love with Sumika but decides to become less dependent on her friend before confessing because she believes love will always fail for her. Meanwhile, Mayu realizes that she might have romantic feelings for Sumika as well, which distracts her in a karate tournament. Later, Sumika runs for student council president, though runs into various problems concerning rumours about her, and is forced to recede when Mayu ends up punching another student for insulting Sumika. As such, Ushio ends up becoming the new student council president.

Characters

The main character of the story, Sumika is intelligent, tall with long black hair and athletically gifted. Her family runs a karate dojo, so she has practiced martial arts since she was little, quickly becoming very strong, even being considered a karate "genius". However, after realizing she was in love with Ushio she decided to quit in order to try to become "cuter". Due to her abilities she's popular at school and, despite her personality not being violent at all, she's sometimes nicknamed "Violent Murasame". She secretly loves Ushio, but the fact that Ushio doesn't return her feelings at all makes her suffer. Often she tries acting cuter, but the results aren't great and Ushio remains oblivious to Sumika's feelings.

Sumika's best friend and classmate who lives alone with her brother, Ushio is a naive girl madly in love with cute girls. She often gets crushes but they are all one-sided. She considers Sumika to be a very precious friend and often says that she is "cool", "not cute" and "not her type". She is completely unaware of Sumika's feelings and her inner reaction to these words. She herself develops feelings for Sumika, but is afraid to act on them based on a bad experience with one of her old friends. She later learns from Tomoe that Sumika is in love with her too, and slowly starts to give Sumika hints.

 A classmate of Sumika and Ushio who is also a lesbian. She is in a relationship with another classmate, Miyako Taema. She is 18 years old, having taken two years off from school to save her family's corporation from bankruptcy (a feat publicly attributed to her father). Due to this age difference, she has a more mature outlook on life than the other characters. The Hachisuka family is very wealthy and traditional, but they have no choice but to accept Tomoe's habits. She claims that "high school is all about being in clubs", so she tries to set up a "Girls' Club" for "girl-loving girls who had no choice but to enter a co-ed school". The proposal is rejected and the girls later reform it into a karate club. She has a driver's license but is a dangerously bad driver.

Tomoe's girlfriend. While she looks like an innocent and clumsy girl, and is popular with boys (who nickname her "Princess"), her true self is quite different, having a devilish, bad-mannered personality, and is always prone to bad-mouth or tease other people. Tomoe is the only one able to 'control' her; they are always together, and for this reason they had no friends before befriending Sumika and the others. Miyako is a daughter of Hachisuka family's driver, a fact that doesn't sit well with the rest of Tomoe's household, but as with other things, they cannot go against her.

A classmate of the main characters, she is introduced in volume 2. Aoi is a yuri fan, in particular she loves the works of the shōjo novelist Orino Masaka, unaware that the author is actually Ushio's brother, Norio, using a pen name. Sumika knows this but she doesn't want to disappoint her, so she keeps it secret. Aoi thinks that love between girls must be something completely pure and fragile, hidden away from people's eyes; for this reason she doesn't like Tomoe and Miyako's relationship, considering them way too blatant. She likes attending yuri-only events and writing yuri dōjinshi, and she wishes to do so with Sumika.

A shy classmate of the main characters. He likes Sumika, but when he notices that she likes Ushio he cross-dresses in order to catch her attention. His younger sister finds out and sends pictures of him to a magazine. To his dismay, he is chosen as a model and pictures of him start appearing in magazines under the alias . Ushio sees the pictures and develops a crush on Akemi and wants to meet 'her'. Akemi's career ends when her 'manhood' is accidentally revealed during a fashion show, but the company keeps Masaki's identity a secret.

A German girl, nicknamed Lotte, introduced in volume three. She's short and she has a very childish appearance; her silky blonde hair and blue eyes make her seem like a doll. Ushio falls for her at first sight and she calls her an 'angel'. Despite her appearance, Lotte's personality isn't feminine at all: she has a harsh way of speaking, she practices karate and wants to become cool and strong like Sumika. She also acts innocently and naively, and at first she's easily tricked by Ushio into wearing cute dresses. When at school she wears a gakuran, a schoolboy's uniform, in order to preserve the "Japanese spirit".

A classmate and friend of Sumika and Ushio, they often eat lunch together. She has a happy personality and she loves eating a lot, particularly curry bread. According to Sumika, she's straight and politely declines any involvement in the dubious activities proposed by Ushio and Tomoe.

A first year student who joins the karate club after Sumika and the others enter their second year of high school. She is an admirer of Sumika's fighting ability and is rather vocal when she does not live to her expectations. Contrary to her stoic appearance, she tends to not be very level headed. She later harbors feelings for Sumika herself, finding herself jealous whenever she sees her with Ushio.

Another first year student and Mayu's best friend, who also joins the karate club. Like Mayu, contrary to Koino's cheerful appearance and attitude, she is the more level headed of the two. Her personality has been affected by witnessing her mother constantly change partners. She is the only one who knows of Mayu's crush on Sumika and soon starts to develop feelings for Mayu herself.

Ushio's older brother. They live alone in a messy house. He is a writer who publishes shōjo yuri novels under the pen name of Orino Masaka (written in kana, it is almost exactly "Kazama Norio" when written backwards). His true identity is not known to his audience, so he is believed to be female.

Masaki's younger sister and the one responsible for throwing him into the modeling business. Although rather teasing in this aspect, she does try to help her brother in her own way as shown when she concocts a scheme to get him together with Sumika.

Production
Whispered Words was written and illustrated by Takashi Ikeda. After joining an independent film crew while in college, Ikeda decided to start drawing on manga as a way to create projects all on his own. His second manga work was submitted to the Shogakukan magazine Big Comic Spirits and subsequently won a small award. Whispered Words was originally conceived as a one-shot manga by Ikeda. Media Factory featured it in this for in the March 2007 of its magazine Monthly Comic Alive before picking it up for full serialization a few months later. After Whispered Words was translated for North American release, Ikeda stated he was unsure if would ever create another yuri-themed manga. Ikeda later authored the yuri manga series , which was serialized on publisher Gentosha's Comic Boost website between January 2020 and February 2022 and localized in North America by Seven Seas Entertainment.

Media

Manga
The Whispered Words manga was serialized in Japan in Media Factory's seinen magazine Monthly Comic Alive between its March 2007 and November 2011 issues. The chapters were collected into nine tankōbon volumes released between December 22, 2007 and January 23, 2012. One Peace Books localized the manga for North American release, compiling the original nine tankōbon volumes into three larger graphic novels and releasing the series between May 13, 2014 and March 17, 2015. The manga has also been licensed for release in Taiwan by Sharp Point Press.
{| class=wikitable <th scope="row" style="text-align: center; font-weight: normal; width: 98%"
|-
! Original No. !! Original Release Date !! Original ISBN !! English No. !! English Release Date !! English ISBN
|-
| 1
| December 22, 2007
| 978-4-8401-1978-8
| rowspan=3 | 1
| rowspan=3 | May 13, 2014
| rowspan=3 | 978-1-935548-45-4
|-
| 2
| April 23, 2008
| 978-4-8401-2219-1
|-
| 3
| September 22, 2008
| 978-4-8401-2270-2
|-
| 4
| March 23, 2009
| 978-4-8401-2550-5
| rowspan=3 | 2
| rowspan=3 | November 18, 2014
| rowspan=3 | 978-1-935548-57-7
|-
| 5
| September 23, 2009
| 978-4-8401-2916-9
|-
| 6
| March 23, 2010
| 978-4-8401-3303-6
|-
| 7
| October 23, 2010
| 978-4-8401-3386-9
| rowspan=3 | 3
| rowspan=3 | March 17, 2015
| rowspan=3 | 978-1-935548-87-4
|-
| 8
| February 23, 2011
| 978-4-8401-3753-9
|-
| 9
| January 23, 2012
| 978-4-8401-4095-9
|}

Anime
A 13-episode anime television series produced by AIC aired on TV Tokyo and TV Aichi between October 7 and December 30, 2009, with rebroadcasts on other stations and AT-X a few days later, and was simulcast by Crunchyroll. The anime takes plot material based on the manga, with the exception of episode twelve, which is an anime-original story.

Video game
A kissing video game, titled Sasame Kisscomi as an app for the iPhone was released by Team Tachyon. The game rates the player on how well they can kiss, and also offers 27 pages of manga, as well as color images of the anime's art for successful kissing.

Reception
Tim Jones of THEM Anime Reviews said he feared that the series would turn into "another Maria Holic" and said that the first few episodes were frustrating to him, but the perverted thoughts of Sumika were "kept in her head, not expressed out loud." He added that although they do not become a couple, it is shown that Ushio really likes Sumika, a subtle yuri relationship. He praised Tomoe and Miyako, an "openly lesbian couple," saying it is nice to see a "yuri couple in a romantic comedy with some bit of humility." He pointed out that Aoi is "a shy girl who loves yuri" and has a crush on Sumika, and was generally fine with the voice cast. He criticized the series music as "nothing to write home about, said that the visual quality of the show looks fine, and said that the show is "an example of a good show wanting to be great," but dragged down by annoying jokes. He further said the series is "older teenagers and up" because must of the cast are lesbians, along with some fan service, and called an episode where a male character, Masaki, dresses up in drag as one of the "most creepy, unfunny episodes" he had seen in a long time.

Carl Kimlinger of Anime News Network said that after the first episode, the "series goes on as if blindsided by its own longevity," spending most of its time, up to episode six, "drifting," and "rudderless" with antics of Akemiya, a cross-dresser, and two lesbian lovers (Tomoe and Miyako) "acquiring a pretty serious patina of goofiness in the process." He also said that the series is a "couple of steps above your average romantic comedy," having some perverse humor, saying it is blessed by "good...background artistry." Kimlinger says that if the show, after its first episode, "feels like a sequel to its first episode," then its a fun sequel with characters which are likable, laughs, and more. He concludes that the series is an "enjoyable and often very funny romantic comedy" while he says that the series never lives up to "the promise of that opening episode" and is visually bland.

Megan Gudeman of CBR said that the anime makes Sumika's crush on her friend, Ushio, "comedic," and said that there is enough "yuri representation throughout the cast to be considered a 2000s staple." Em Casalena said the series shows a relationship with themes "you’d find in any teen romance" but it is between "two openly lesbian high school students," with a focus on lesbophobia and being a "young gay student in Japan." Casalena also says that the story is "incredibly relatable" with those girls who are closeted likely finding "parallels between her life" and the events in the series.

References

External links
 Anime official website 
 Sasameki Koto anime at TV Tokyo 

2007 manga
2009 Japanese television series debuts
2009 Japanese television series endings
Anime International Company
Japanese LGBT-related animated television series
Media Factory manga
Kadokawa Dwango franchises
Romantic comedy anime and manga
Seinen manga
Sharp Point Press titles
TV Tokyo original programming
Yuri (genre) anime and manga
Lesbian-related comics
2000s LGBT literature
2000s LGBT-related comedy television series